The Kazakh Foreign Intelligence Service ( Qazaqstan Respýblıkasynyń "Syrbar" syrtqy barlaý qyzmeti or just Syrbar) is Kazakhstan's primary external intelligence agency.  The Syrbar is the successor of the Barlau Department in the National Security Committee of the Republic of Kazakhstan since February 2009.

History 

 October 15, 1993 - President Nursultan Nazarbayev signed a decree "On the creation of intelligence units in the National Security Committee and the Ministry of Defense of the Republic of Kazakhstan".
 November 5, 1997 - the Brlau Department was created as an independent foreign intelligence agency under the KNB.
 February 17, 2009 - the Foreign Intelligence Service "Syrbar" directly subordinate to the President was re-established .
 June 17, 2019 - the Foreign Intelligence Service "Syrbar" is put under the National Security Committee and renamed to the Foreign Intelligence Service of the National Security Committee.

Directors 

 Amanzhol Zhankuliyev (April 14, 2011 - ?)
Issatai Sartayev (September 27, 2018 - February 12, 2019)
 Gabit Bayanov (since February 12, 2019)

Symbols

Flag 
The flag is a blue flat fabric. The ratio of the width and length of the flag is 1:2. In the center of the flag is a yellow expressive eagle with outstretched wings, while on the right forearm of the eagle is an amulet spear made of white flame of a horse. On the left side of the eagle is a national silver shield with a round blue border, the middle part of which is diagonally combined with two ribbons made of gold national ornaments. In the center of the shield is an amulet made of white horse flame.

Emblem 
The emblem of Syrbar is a round shield with a blue border. In the center of the shield is a light blue expressive globe with parallels and meridians in yellow, at the bottom of which there is a blue motto ribbon with a yellow inscription "Syrbar". In the center of the globe is the emblem of a golden eagle with outstretched wings, similar to the one found on the flag.  At the top of the shield is the inscription "Republic of Kazakhstan", while at the bottom says "Foreign Intelligence Service", both in the Kazakh language.

Departmental awards 

 Medals:
 Veteran of the Syrbar Service Medal
 Medal "For Excellent Service"
 Medal "For Contribution to External Intelligence"
 Badges:
 Badge "For Excellent Service"

Cooperation with foreign intelligence services 
An agreement on intelligence cooperation between USA and Kazakhstan was signed in 2010. This secret treaty covers cooperation of the CIA with the Kazakh Intelligence Service.

See also
United States government security breaches
Foreign Intelligence Service (Russia)
KGB

Notes

External links
 

2009 establishments in Kazakhstan
Government of Kazakhstan
Government agencies established in 2009